Prunus dolichobotrys is a species of Prunus native to New Guinea, the Bismarck Archipelago, and the Raja Ampat Islands. It is a tree reaching 30m, and is morphologically very similar to Prunus gazellepeninsulae, aside from their fruit. Native people use its leaves in soups and other dishes for their flavor.

References

dolichobotrys
Edible plants
Flora of Papuasia
Plants described in 1965